"Truly" is the debut solo single by American singer-songwriter Lionel Richie. Resuming where he left off with D-flat major tunes "Sail On" and particularly "Still" when he was lead for the Commodores, Richie wrote the song and co-produced it with James Anthony Carmichael.

Released as the first single from his self-titled debut album in 1982, "Truly" debuted on the Billboard Hot 100 on 9 October 1982 and climbed to No. 1 on 27 November – 4 December 1982. It also spent four weeks at No. 1 on the adult contemporary chart, and logged nine weeks at No. 2 on the R&B chart, behind Marvin Gaye's "Sexual Healing".  In addition, "Truly" made the top 10 in United Kingdom, where the song peaked at No. 6. The song won a Grammy Award for Richie in the category Best Male Pop Vocal Performance.

Billboard called it a "moving ballad with all the drama and poignance of 'Still', 'Three Times a Lady' and 'Endless Love'."

Music video
In the music video for "Truly", Lionel Richie performs the song live on a piano.

Track listing
 7" single
"Truly"
"Just Put Some Love in Your Heart"

Charts

Weekly charts

Year-end charts

Certifications

Steven Houghton version

British singer and actor Steven Houghton released a cover version of "Truly" in March 1998 which reached the top 30 of the UK Singles Chart. The song was played in the series 10 finale of London's Burning, in which Houghton starred in.

Track listing
 CD single
 "Truly" – 3:20
 "Wind Beneath My Wings" – 4:30

Charts

Other cover versions
 2009: Freestyle on their 2009 album Playlist.
 2013: Richard Poon on his 2013 album Legends.

Use in media
 The song was used in the Philippine film I'll Wait for You released by Regal Entertainment in 1982, which was shot in both Manila and San Francisco.

See also
 List of number-one singles of 1982 (Canada)
 List of Billboard Hot 100 number ones of 1982
 List of Billboard Adult Contemporary number ones of 1982

References

External links
 List of cover versions of "Truly" at SecondHandSongs.com

1982 songs
1982 debut singles
1998 singles
Lionel Richie songs
Steven Houghton songs
Billboard Hot 100 number-one singles
Cashbox number-one singles
RPM Top Singles number-one singles
Grammy Award for Best Male Pop Vocal Performance
Songs written by Lionel Richie
Song recordings produced by James Anthony Carmichael
Pop ballads
1980s ballads
Motown singles
Bertelsmann Music Group singles